Scleranthus perennis, the perennial knawel, is a perennial herbaceous plant in the family Caryophyllaceae. It grows on sandy, dry, acidic soils. It can grow up to 15 cm high and has white flowers of 2–5 mm. The plant used to be economically significant as the major host plant of the Polish cochineal.

References

Caryophyllaceae
Plants described in 1753
Taxa named by Carl Linnaeus